Dajipur is a small village about  from Mumbai on the road connecting the NH 17 and Kolhapur about 40 km from Radhanagari. It is best known for the Bison wildlife sanctuary and the Gagangiri Maharaj in Gaganbawda.

References

Villages in Kolhapur district